Wicked City (French: Hans le marin; alternate title: The Last Port) is a 1949 French-American drama film directed by François Villiers and starring the husband-and-wife team of Jean-Pierre Aumont and Maria Montez. It was Montez's first film in Europe.

Wicked City and The Man on the Eiffel Tower were the first French-American film co-productions following World War II.

Plot
Hans is a Canadian sailor docked in  Marseilles who is having an affair with cabaret owner Dolores. When he is robbed and left for dead, he awakens to discover that Dolores has disappeared. He takes on a job as a nightclub bouncer and has a fling with gypsy girl Tania.

Cast
Jean-Pierre Aumont
Maria Montez
Lilli Palmer

Production
Aumont served with the Free French army during World War II and was wounded by shrapnel near  Marseilles in 1944. While recuperating, he read the novel Hans le marin by Edouard Peisson, and in 1946 he, his wife and his brother François Villiers visited Peisson to negotiate to purchase the film rights. Aumont was to write the script, Villiers was to direct and Montez and Aumont would star. The goal was to show Montez "is an actress as well as a manikin."

Andre Sarrut of Safia Productions agreed to pay the production costs of the film, up to 80,000 francs (then US$250,000). Aumont was to produce through his company with Montez, Christina Productions. Christina provided the services of Aumont, Montez and Lilli Palmer; in exchange, Christina's share would be paid off first out of American box-office receipts.

Filming began in  Marseilles in July 1948. Approximately 60% of the film was shot on location, with the remainder filmed at the Joinville Studios in Paris.

References

External links 
 

Films set in Marseille
1949 films
French drama films
1949 drama films
1940s French-language films
Films shot at Joinville Studios
Films directed by François Villiers
French black-and-white films
English-language French films
1940s French films